Mutawakilu Fuseini (born 1 June 1996) is a Ghanaian professional footballer who plays as a centre back.

Career
Fuseini  began his career with lower division club Saraphina FC, has played in Ghana for King Faisal Babes, Young Wise FC, and Liberty Professionals.

Liberty
Fuseini joined Liberty Professionals on one-year deal in January 2016.

References

1996 births
Living people
Ghanaian Muslims
Ghanaian footballers
Ghana Premier League players
Liberty Professionals F.C. players
Association football central defenders